Milford is a city in Clermont and Hamilton counties in the U.S. state of Ohio. Located along the Little Miami River and its East Fork in the southwestern part of the state, it is a part of the Cincinnati metropolitan area. The population was 6,582 at the 2020 census.

History

The area within Milford, Old Milford, and O'Bannon Township were all built on a survey by John Nancarrow, a Revolutionary War veteran from Virginia. O'Bannon Township, now Miami Township, was named for Clermont's first surveyor. A field along Gatch Avenue, on what was once the farm of John Gatch, has yielded large numbers of artifacts for several generations. It is now believed to have been the site of a Native American village during the Woodland period. The settlement commenced in 1796 near where two riverways—the Little Miami River and its East Fork—come together. It was later named Milford. The first Methodist class in the Northwest Territory was begun there in 1797. Due to a great Methodist influence, including the life of Rev. Francis McCormick, Milford is at the root of Methodist religious heritage westward from Appalachia. Four years later, Gatch decided to sell  to Ambrose Ranson who, soon after, sold  to John Hageman. Hageman became the first long settler, naming the valley Hageman's Mills. Nowadays, the field next to Gatch's Estate belongs to the Valley View conservancy, having been an archaeological site called the Gatch Site.

After generations as a village, in 1982 after a census count of 5232, Milford attained city status.

Demographics

2010 census
As of the census of 2010, there were 6,709 people, 3,019 households, and 1,572 families living in the city. The racial makeup of the city was 94.6% White, 2.3% African American, 0.1% Native American, 0.8% Asian, 0.4% from other races, and 1.6% from two or more races. Hispanic or Latino of any race were 1.1% of the population.

There were 3,019 households, of which 25.3% had children under the age of 18 living with them, 36.0% were married couples living together, 11.6% had a female householder with no husband present, 4.5% had a male householder with no wife present, and 47.9% were non-families. 41.7% of all households were made up of individuals, and 19.3% had someone living alone who was 65 years of age or older. The average household size was 2.12 and the average family size was 2.92.

The median age in the city was 43.2 years. 21.4% of residents were under the age of 18; 6.9% were between the ages of 18 and 24; 24.3% were from 25 to 44; 25.5% were from 45 to 64; and 21.9% were 65 years of age or older. The gender makeup of the city was 45.2% male and 54.8% female.

2000 census
As of the census of 2000, there were 6,284 people, 2,945 households, and 1,534 families living in the city. The population density was 1,672.1 people per square mile (645.3/km2). There were 3,112 housing units at an average density of 828.0 per square mile (319.6/km2). The racial makeup of the city was 95.08% White, 3.33% African American, 0.13% Native American, 0.45% Asian, 0.03% Pacific Islander, 0.32% from other races, and 0.67% from two or more races. Hispanic or Latino of any race were 0.91% of the population.

There were 2,945 households, out of which 24.6% had children under the age of 18 living with them, 39.5% were married couples living together, 9.6% had a female householder with no husband present, and 47.9% were non-families. 43.1% of all households were made up of individuals, and 21.9% had someone living alone who was 65 years of age or older. The average household size was 2.09 and the average family size was 2.92.

In the city the population was spread out, with 22.6% under the age of 18, 7.6% from 18 to 24, 28.6% from 25 to 44, 19.9% from 45 to 64, and 21.3% who were 65 years of age or older. The median age was 39 years. For every 100 females, there were 81.3 males. For every 100 females age 18 and over, there were 75.2 males.

The median income for a household in the city was $31,923, and the median income for a family was $51,919. Males had a median income of $36,538 versus $25,873 for females. The per capita income for the city was $22,529. About 4.1% of families and 7.8% of the population were below the poverty line, including 11.6% of those under age 18 and 11.3% of those age 65 or over.

Economy
Area businesses and groups with substantial operations in Milford or adjacent townships include the headquarters of Penn Station sandwiches, Siemens Digital Industries Software, Total Quality Logistics, Overhoff Technology the North American headquarters of Tata, and the United Church of God.

Parks and recreation

Milford is located at  (39.174883, -84.284383). The Little Miami Bike Trail, which runs from Newtown to Springfield, Ohio, runs through Milford where several major hiking trails converge, including the American Discovery Trail, the Sea to Sea Long Distance Hiking Route, and the Underground Railroad Cycling Route. Ancient mounds have been found, and made more visible by overhead scans; at the city cemetery, Greenlawn.

City fairs
 Milford Frontier Days, main festival
 Art Affaire, a crafts festival

Education
Milford Exempted Village School District has ~6,600 students. On the 2020 state report, Milford High School ranked within the top 100 out of 750 in Ohio and in the top 10 of all Greater Cincinnati schools. In addition to the high school, middle school, and preschool, the six neighborhood schools are McCormick, Meadowview, Mulberry, Pattison, Seipelt, and Smith. The Promont houses the Greater Milford Area Historical Society and yearbooks of all Milford classes.  Milford shares a branch of Clermont County Public Library.

Notable people
 John M. Pattison, 43rd Governor of Ohio
 Markiplier, Youtuber and vlogger

References

External links

 City website

Cities in Clermont County, Ohio
Cities in Hamilton County, Ohio
Populated places established in 1802
1802 establishments in the Northwest Territory
Cities in Ohio